The 2004–05 Tampa Bay Lightning season was the franchise's 13th season in the National Hockey League. Its games were canceled due to the lockout of players. Because the entire season was canceled due to the lockout, the Lightning were allowed to retain their status as the Stanley Cup champions.

Schedule
Tampa Bay’s regular season schedule was announced on July 14, 2004. Their preseason schedule was released on August 2, 2004.

|-
| 1 || September 23 || @ Montreal Canadiens
|-
| 2 || September 25 || Carolina Hurricanes
|-
| 3 || September 26 || @ Atlanta Thrashers
|-
| 4 || September 28 || Carolina Hurricanes
|-
| 5 || October 3 || Florida Panthers
|-
| 6 || October 5 || Atlanta Thrashers
|-
| 7 || October 8 || @ Florida Panthers
|-
| 8 || October 10 || Buffalo Sabres
|-

|-
| 1 || October 13 || Philadelphia Flyers
|-
| 2 || October 16 || Florida Panthers
|-
| 3 || October 18 || @ Buffalo Sabres
|-
| 4 || October 21 || @ Phoenix Coyotes
|-
| 5 || October 23 || @ Colorado Avalanche
|-
| 6 || October 27 || Nashville Predators
|-
| 7 || October 29 || Washington Capitals
|-
| 8 || November 1 || @ New York Islanders
|-
| 9 || November 2 || @ Toronto Maple Leafs
|-
| 10 || November 4 || Carolina Hurricanes
|-
| 11 || November 6 || @ New Jersey Devils
|-
| 12 || November 10 || @ Atlanta Thrashers
|-
| 13 || November 11 || Calgary Flames
|-
| 14 || November 13 || Atlanta Thrashers
|-
| 15 || November 18 || @ Boston Bruins
|-
| 16 || November 20 || @ Ottawa Senators
|-
| 17 || November 24 || Vancouver Canucks
|-
| 18 || November 26 || New Jersey Devils
|-
| 19 || November 27 || @ Carolina Hurricanes
|-
| 20 || November 30 || @ Philadelphia Flyers
|-
| 21 || December 2 || St. Louis Blues
|-
| 22 || December 4 || Florida Panthers
|-
| 23 || December 7 || @ Atlanta Thrashers
|-
| 24 || December 9 || Montreal Canadiens
|-
| 25 || December 11 || Ottawa Senators
|-
| 26 || December 14 || @ Montreal Canadiens
|-
| 27 || December 15 || @ New Jersey Devils
|-
| 28 || December 17 || Buffalo Sabres
|-
| 29 || December 19 || @ Columbus Blue Jackets
|-
| 30 || December 22 || @ Chicago Blackhawks
|-
| 31 || December 23 || @ Minnesota Wild
|-
| 32 || December 26 || @ Washington Capitals
|-
| 33 || December 27 || Boston Bruins
|-
| 34 || December 29 || New Jersey Devils
|-
| 35 || January 1 || New York Rangers
|-
| 36 || January 2 || Dallas Stars
|-
| 37 || January 5 || @ Anaheim Mighty Ducks
|-
| 38 || January 6 || @ Los Angeles Kings
|-
| 39 || January 8 || @ San Jose Sharks
|-
| 40 || January 12 || Minnesota Wild
|-
| 41 || January 14 || Washington Capitals
|-
| 42 || January 15 || @ Florida Panthers
|-
| 43 || January 17 || Buffalo Sabres
|-
| 44 || January 19 || Boston Bruins
|-
| 45 || January 21 || @ Carolina Hurricanes
|-
| 46 || January 22 || @ Pittsburgh Penguins
|-
| 47 || January 25 || @ Philadelphia Flyers
|-
| 48 || January 27 || Toronto Maple Leafs
|-
| 49 || January 29 || @ Boston Bruins
|-
| 50 || January 30 || Pittsburgh Penguins
|-
| 51 || February 1 || Chicago Blackhawks
|-
| 52 || February 5 || Atlanta Thrashers
|-
| 53 || February 8 || @ Washington Capitals
|-
| 54 || February 10 || New York Islanders
|-
| 55 || February 15 || Ottawa Senators
|-
| 56 || February 17 || New York Islanders
|-
| 57 || February 19 || Detroit Red Wings
|-
| 58 || February 21 || @ Carolina Hurricanes
|-
| 59 || February 23 || @ New York Rangers
|-
| 60 || February 25 || @ Buffalo Sabres
|-
| 61 || February 26 || @ Ottawa Senators
|-
| 62 || March 1 || Toronto Maple Leafs
|-
| 63 || March 4 || Carolina Hurricanes
|-
| 64 || March 5 || @ Florida Panthers
|-
| 65 || March 8 || @ Pittsburgh Penguins
|-
| 66 || March 11 || Edmonton Oilers
|-
| 67 || March 12 || Washington Capitals
|-
| 68 || March 14 || @ Dallas Stars
|-
| 69 || March 16 || Philadelphia Flyers
|-
| 70 || March 18 || Pittsburgh Penguins
|-
| 71 || March 19 || @ Florida Panthers
|-
| 72 || March 22 || @ New York Islanders
|-
| 73 || March 24 || Montreal Canadiens
|-
| 74 || March 26 || Florida Panthers
|-
| 75 || March 28 || @ Toronto Maple Leafs
|-
| 76 || March 29 || @ Montreal Canadiens
|-
| 77 || March 31 || New York Rangers
|-
| 78 || April 2 || @ Washington Capitals
|-
| 79 || April 4 || @ New York Rangers
|-
| 80 || April 6 || Carolina Hurricanes
|-
| 81 || April 8 || Atlanta Thrashers
|-
| 82 || April 10 || @ Atlanta Thrashers
|-

Transactions
The Lightning were involved in the following transactions from June 8, 2004, the day after the deciding game of the 2004 Stanley Cup Finals, through February 16, 2005, the day the  season was officially canceled.

Trades

Players acquired

Players lost

Signings

Draft picks
Tampa Bay's picks at the 2004 NHL Entry Draft, which was held at the RBC Center in Raleigh, North Carolina on June 26–27, 2004.

Notes

References

Tam
Tam
Tampa Bay Lightning seasons
Tamp
Tamp